All India Institute of Medical Sciences, Bilaspur (AIIMS Bilaspur) is a public Institute of National importance. The medical school and hospital is based in Bilaspur, Himachal Pradesh, India, and is one of the All India Institutes of Medical Sciences (AIIMSs). On 4 October  2017 Prime Minister Narendra Modi laid the foundation stone of the institute. It was inaugurated on 05 October 2022.

Academics 
The institute became operational with the first batch of 50 MBBS students, one of the four AIIMSs to become operational in academic year 2020–21. PGIMER Chandigarh is the mentor institute of AIIMS Bilaspur.

See also
 All India Institute of Medical Sciences, Guwahati

References

All India Institutes of Medical Sciences
Educational institutions established in 2020
2020 establishments in Himachal Pradesh
Bilaspur, Himachal Pradesh
Medical colleges in Himachal Pradesh